Mick Morris (born 1943) is an Irish former Gaelic footballer. He played for his local club John Mitchels and was a member of the Kerry senior inter-county team from 1964 until 1969. He went on to represent Ireland in golf, winning the Irish Close Championship in 1978.

References

 

1943 births
Living people
John Mitchels (Kerry) Gaelic footballers
Kerry inter-county Gaelic footballers
Munster inter-provincial Gaelic footballers